This table shows an overview of the protected heritage sites in the Walloon town Charleroi. This list is part of Belgium's national heritage.

|}

See also 
 List of protected heritage sites in Hainaut (province)
Charleroi

References
 Belgian heritage register: Direction générale opérationnelle - Aménagement du territoire, Logement, Patrimoine et Energie (DG4)
 www.dglive.be

Charleroi